Antti Nykänen (born 14 October 1983 in Kellokoski, Finland) is a Finnish professional basketball player.

Nykänen currently plays for the Plymouth Raiders in the British Basketball League; the 6 ft 6 in (1.98 m) forward is now in his second season with the first team. Although having spent much of his time in Raiders' development teams, he has yet to break into the starting five.

From 2001 to 2002 Nykänen studied at Sierra High School in Tollhouse, California. Since 2005, besides playing, he has studied Sports' Management at the University of Plymouth.

References

1983 births
Living people
Alumni of the University of Plymouth
British Basketball League players
Finnish men's basketball players
Finnish expatriate basketball people in the United States
Plymouth Raiders players
Sportspeople from Uusimaa